Marina V. Rodnina (born 19 November 1960) is a biochemist.

Life 
Born in Kyiv, Rodnina studied biology at the University of Kyiv and obtained her PhD in molecular biology and genetics in 1989. From 1990 to 1992, she was a research fellow of the Alexander von Humboldt Foundation at the Witten/Herdecke University. Afterwards, she was a research assistant at the same university and she received her habilitation in 1997. From 1998 to 2008, she was a professor at the Witten/Herdecke University. Since 2008, she is a scientific member and the director of the Max Planck Institute for Biophysical Chemistry.

Research 

Rodnina's research focuses on protein synthesis by and function on the ribosome. In collaboration with colleagues, she was the first to visualize the activity of a ribosome with the help of a 3D cryo-electron microscope.

Awards 
Rodnina is a member of the Göttingen Academy of Sciences and Humanities and the Academy of Sciences Leopoldina. She was awarded the Hans Neurath Award in 2015, the Gottfried Wilhelm Leibniz Prize in 2016, and the Otto Warburg Medal in 2019.

References 

21st-century German biologists
21st-century German chemists
German biochemists
German women biochemists
German women biologists
Living people
1960 births
Members of the German Academy of Sciences Leopoldina
Scientists from Kyiv
Max Planck Institute directors